The European Journal of Protistology is a medical journal that covers the entire scope of protistology, from their development and ecology to molecular biology. The journal is published by Elsevier. It is official journal of the Federation of European Protistological Societies.

Abstracting and indexing 
The journal is abstracted and indexed for example in:

 Web of Science

 Elsevier BIOBASE

According to the Journal Citation Reports, the journal has a 2021 impact factor of 3.471.

References

External links 

Biology in Europe
Biology journals
English-language journals
Elsevier academic journals